Graptopsaltria nigrofuscata, the large brown cicada, is a species of cicada in the genus Graptopsaltria of the family Cicadidae found across East Asia, including Japan, the Korean Peninsula, and China. They are called  in Japanese. The males make a loud chirping that ends with a click caused by a flick of the wings.

Description

Life Cycle
Their median life cycle from egg to natural adult death is around three years.

References

External links
 

Hemiptera of Asia
Insects described in 1866
Polyneurini